Khaneh Kenar (also Romanized as Khāneh Kenār; also known as Khānī Kenār) is a village in Taher Gurab Rural District, in the Central District of Sowme'eh Sara County, Gilan Province, Iran. At the 2006 census, its population was 341, in 105 families.

References 

Populated places in Sowme'eh Sara County